Rutilodexia is a genus of parasitic flies in the family Tachinidae.

Species
Rutilodexia angustipennis (Walker, 1858)
Rutilodexia papua (Bigot, 1880)
Rutilodexia prisca (Enderlein, 1936)

References

Dexiinae
Diptera of Australasia
Tachinidae genera
Taxa named by Charles Henry Tyler Townsend